Ballymorin is a civil parish in County Westmeath, Ireland.

Ballymorin is one of 9 civil parishes in the barony of Rathconrath in the Province of Leinster.

Ballymorin civil parish comprises 11 townlands: Ballymorin, Cappaghjuan,  Clonymurtagh, Corr, Dalystown, Killeenerk, Lenamore, Newbristy North, Newbristy South, Rathcarra and Tobercormick.

The neighbouring civil parishes are: Piercetown and Templepatrick to the north, Rathconrath to the north–east, Conry to the south–east and Killare to the south–west.

References

External links
Ballymorin civil parish at the IreAtlas Townland Data Base
Ballymorin civil parish at townlands.ie
Ballymorin civil parish at The Placenames Database of Ireland

Civil parishes of County Westmeath